The 1934 New Zealand tour rugby to Australia was the 15th tour by the New Zealand national rugby union team to Australia. 

The "Wallabies" won the Bledisloe Cup, with a victory and a tie.

The tour 
Scores and results list New Zealand's points tally first.

External links 
 New Zealand in Australia 1934 from rugbymuseum.co.nz

New Zealand
New Zealand tour
Australia tour
New Zealand national rugby union team tours of Australia